Stories Untold is the tenth studio album by Singaporean singer JJ Lin, released on March 13, 2013, by Warner Music Taiwan.

Track listing
 "因你而在" (You N Me) 
 "零度的親吻" (Frozen Kiss) 
 "黑暗騎士" (The Dark Knight) feat. Ashin of Mayday 
 "修煉愛情" (Practice Love) 
 "飛機" (Fly Back in Time) feat. Eugene Lin 
 "巴洛克先生" (Mr. Baroque) feat. Leehom Wang 
 "One Shot" feat. Leehom Wang 
 "裂縫中的陽光" (Before Sunrise) 
 "友人說" (Somebody) feat. Harry Chang
 "十秒的衝動" (10 Seconds of Insane Bravery) 
 "以後要做的事" (Future Tense)
 "一千年後記得我" (Remember, Forever)

References

2013 albums
JJ Lin albums